William Coote (1863 – 14 December 1924) was an Irish Unionist politician. He was elected unopposed as Member of Parliament for South Tyrone at the February 1916 by-election caused by the death of the incumbent Andrew Horner. He was re-elected at the 1918 general election and served until the constituency was abolished in 1922.

In 1921, he was elected to House of Commons of Northern Ireland for the constituency of Fermanagh and Tyrone. He died in 1924 and his seat remained vacant at dissolution.

References

External links

 

1863 births
1924 deaths
Members of the Parliament of the United Kingdom for County Tyrone constituencies (1801–1922)
Ulster Unionist Party members of the House of Commons of the United Kingdom
UK MPs 1910–1918
UK MPs 1918–1922
Members of the House of Commons of Northern Ireland for Fermanagh and Tyrone
Ulster Unionist Party members of the House of Commons of Northern Ireland
Members of the House of Commons of Northern Ireland 1921–1925
Irish Unionist Party MPs